The Learning Curve International School is an English medium selective international private school in Mysore, India. The school follows the Edexcel curriculum and offers education for students from foundation 1 up to the International Advanced Levels.

History 
The Learning Curve International School was started  in J.P. Nagar in a house in Mysore, by an English couple, Felicity and Terry Gibson. The school was managed by the Prof V. Puttamadappa Education Trust along with the Gibsons from 2014 until 2016 when it was completely handed over to the Trust. The school was moved, in 2014, to a new, bigger campus in Vijaynagar 2nd stage, Mysore, where it is currently located. TLC recently celebrated its tenth anniversary with the release of a newsletter, an introductory film.

Curriculum and extracurricular activities
The Learning Curve was the first international school in Mysore and is, today, among the best in the country with nearly 30% of "Edexcel High Achiever" awardees in 2016 being students of TLC, according to the school's website . TLC follows the Edexcel curriculum with grades from foundation 1 all the way to the International Advanced Levels.

Apart from the subjects students opt for and are trained in, the school has various activities designed to help students mould their life better. Activities like dance, drama and music are a regular part of the student life at TLC. Most grades at the Primary levels have weekly and/or fortnightly excursions. Higher levels also have field trips every year.

There is emphasis on physical education and various creative activities for children. Literary, scientific and cultural competitions take place throughout the academic year. Art classes, clay moulding, gardening, etc. are all part of a school week.

References

External links

 School website
 Facebook page

Private schools in Karnataka
International schools in India
Schools in Mysore district
2014 establishments in Karnataka
Educational institutions established in 2014